The men's shot put at the 2010 African Championships in Athletics was held on July 28.

Results

External links
Results

Shot
Shot put at the African Championships in Athletics